110 may refer to:

110 (number), natural number
AD 110, a year
110 BC, a year
110 film, a cartridge-based film format used in still photography
110 (MBTA bus), Massachusetts Bay Transportation Authority bus route
110 (song), 2019 song by Capital Bra and Samra from the album Berlin lebt 2
Lenovo IdeaPad 110, a discontinued brand of notebook computers
International 110, an American keelboat design, usually just called the 110
Police-110, an emergency telephone number in Iran
Kei Lun stop (MTR digital station code 110), a Light Rail stop in Tuen Mun, Hong Kong
An anti-Semitic dogwhistle referring to the number of countries that the Jews have been expelled from

See also
1/10 (disambiguation)
Darmstadtium, synthetic chemical element with atomic number 110